Cheniella is a genus of flowering plants in the legume family, Fabaceae. It belongs to the subfamily Cercidoideae. This genus differs from Phanera in having a hypanthium that is equal in length or longer than the sepals, indehiscent fruit, many-seeded fruit, and the funicle extending most of the circumference of the seed.

Species
Cheniella comprises the following species:
 Cheniella clemensiorum (Merr.) R.Clark & Mackinder
 Cheniella corymbosa (Roxb.) R.Clark & Mackinder
 Cheniella damiaoshanensis (T.C.Chen) R.Clark & Mackinder
 Cheniella didyma (H.Y.Chen) R.Clark & Mackinder
 Cheniella glauca (Wall. ex Benth.) R.Clark & Mackinder
 Cheniella lakhonensis (Gagnep.) R.Clark & Mackinder
 Cheniella ovatifolia (T.C.Chen) R.Clark & Mackinder
 Cheniella quinnanensis (T.C.Chen) R.Clark & Mackinder
 subsp. gandhiana (Gogoi & Bandyop.) R.Clark & Mackinder
 subsp. quinnanensis (T.C.Chen) R.Clark & Mackinder
 subsp. villosa R.Clark & Mackinder
 Cheniella tenuiflora (Watt ex C.B.Clarke) R.Clark & Mackinder
 Cheniella touranensis (Gagnep.) R.Clark & Mackinder

References

Cercidoideae
Fabaceae genera